Xanthograpta is a genus of moths of the family Noctuidae. The genus was erected by George Hampson in 1910.

Species
 Xanthograpta basinigra Sugi, 1982
 Xanthograpta glycychroa Turner, 1904
 Xanthograpta purpurascens Hampson, 1910
 Xanthograpta trilatalis Walker, [1866]

References

Acontiinae